First Presbyterian Church is a historic Presbyterian church located at Hill and East Streets in Keytesville, Chariton County, Missouri. It was built in 1853, and is a one-story, Classical Revival style frame building with a turn-of-the-20th century Romanesque Revival derivative style addition.  It features a two-story plus belfry tower.

It was listed on the National Register of Historic Places in 1977.

References

Presbyterian churches in Missouri
National Register of Historic Places in Chariton County, Missouri
Neoclassical architecture in Missouri
Romanesque Revival church buildings in Missouri
Churches completed in 1853
Buildings and structures in Chariton County, Missouri
Churches on the National Register of Historic Places in Missouri
Neoclassical church buildings in the United States